Mónica Ramos (born 14 October 1998) is a Colombian footballer who plays as a defender for Grêmio and the Colombia women's national team.

International career
Ramos made her international debut in a friendly against the United States on 17 June 2022. On 3 July, she was called up by Nelson Abadía to represent Colombia at the 2022 Copa América Femenina.

Honours
Internacional
Campeonato Gaúcho de Futebol Feminino: 2022
Colombia
Copa América Femenina runner-up: 2022

References

External links

1998 births
Living people
People from Sucre Department
Colombian women's footballers
Women's association football defenders
Colombia women's international footballers
21st-century Colombian women
Independiente Santa Fe (women) players
Grêmio Foot-Ball Porto Alegrense (women) players